Kingman is a hamlet in central Alberta, Canada within Camrose County.

The hamlet is located in Census Division No. 10 and in the federal riding of Crowfoot.

As proclaimed on the entry signs for the hamlet, Kingman is known as the Lutefisk capital of Alberta.

Demographics 

See also 
List of communities in Alberta
List of designated places in Alberta
List of hamlets in Alberta

References

External links 
Kingman website

Camrose County
Hamlets in Alberta
Designated places in Alberta